Be Aib is a 2016 Pakistani drama television series aired on Urdu 1, produced by Dr.Ali Kazmi and Fahad Mustafa under their production banner Big Bang Entertainment. Be Aib is the story of a woman and her obsession with perfection, which causes turmoil in her daughter's life.

Plot
Shahana and Sadaf are sisters who are married into affluent families. Sadaf is of controlling nature and judges people based on their social status. She has shrewdly arranged for her daughter Tooba to be engaged to Shahana’s son Taimur knowing that he is the sole heir to Shahana and Gulrez’s wealth. Safi is Shahana and Sadaf’s only brother, but he is not as wealthy as his sisters are. While Shahana is warm towards Safi and his wife Aisha, Sadaf mocks Safi for his middle-class mindset. Safi has two children, Ahmed and Inaya.

Taimur meets with an accident and undergoes multiple surgeries. Later, the doctor tells Taimur’s parents that Taimur may not walk again without crutches. Sadaf can't bear that her daughter will be marrying a disabled person. She decides to fix Tooba’s marriage somewhere else and bars her from meeting Taimur.

Inaya gets married to Taimur. Sadaf arranges a meet between Tooba and a prospective groom Fawad. Fawad instantly likes Tooba and urges Sadaf to expedite the wedding. On their wedding night, Taimur tells Inaya that he can never forget Tooba. Inaya tells him that if her love for him is true, it will make a place in his heart.  Tooba gets married to Fawad.

Meanwhile, with Inaya’s encouragement, Taimur begins to walk without the walking stick. Later, Fawad meets Sarmad and apologises for keeping his first marriage a secret. Sarmad assures him of his support.

Fawad gets killed in an accident. Tooba is devastated, but Sadaf is impervious to Tooba’s anguish. Sadaf wants to separate Inaya and Taimur. She wants Tooba to marry Tooba.

Cast
Samina Peerzada as Sadaf; Tooba's mother and sister of Shahana and Safi
Alishba Yousuf as Tooba; Sadaf's daughter and love interest of Ahmed and Taimur
Noor Hassan Rizvi as Taimur; Shahana's son and love interest of Tooba and Anaya
Imran Aslam as Ahmed; Safi's son who likes Tooba
Mariam Ansari as Anaya; Safi's daughter who likes Taimur
Ismat Zaidi as Shahana; Taimur's mother and sister of Sadaf and Safi
Tariq Jameel as Safi; Anaya and Ahmed's father and brother of Shahana and Sadaf
Shehryar Zaidi as Sarmad; Tooba's father and Sadaf's husband
Manzoor Qureshi as Gulraiz; Taimur's father and Shahana's husband
Nida Mumtaz as Ayesha; Anaya and Ahmed's mother and Safi's wife
Asad Zaman as Fawad; Tooba's husband
Shazia Akhtar as Maria; Sadaf's friend

References

External links
 Official Website

Urdu-language television shows
Pakistani drama television series
2016 Pakistani television series debuts
Urdu 1 original programming